Bryophila is a genus of moths of the family Noctuidae. The genus was described by Treitschke in 1825.

Taxonomy
Robert W. Poole (1989) considered Bryophila to be a synonym of Cryphia Hübner, 1818.

Species
Subgenus Scythobrya
Bryophila maeonis Lederer, 1865 Cyprus, Asia Minor, Turkey, Syria, Lebanon, Palestine, Jordan, Iraq, Iran, Armenia, southern European Russia, Turkmenistan, north-western Kazakhstan, Kirghizstan, Afghanistan
Bryophila paulina Staudinger, [1892] Syria, Palestine, Egypt, Arabia
Bryophila eucharista (Boursin, 1960) Iran
Bryophila occidentalis Osthelder, 1933 Turkey
Bryophila icterica (Boursin, 1960) Afghanistan
Bryophila hedygrapha (Boursin, 1963) Afghanistan
Bryophila ancharista (Boursin, 1970) Pakistan
Bryophila uzahovi (Ronkay & Herczig, 1991) Caucasus
Bryophila salomonis (Boursin, 1954) Iran (Elburs)
Bryophila plumbeola Staudinger, 1881 Syria, western Turkestan
Bryophila molybdea (Boursin, 1960) Afghanistan
Bryophila omotoi (Boursin, 1967) Afghanistan
Bryophila hampsoni Draudt, 1931 northern Alai
Bryophila duskei Christoph, 1893 Transcaucasus
Bryophila literata Moore, 1881 Kashmir, Punjab
Bryophila subliterata Filipjev, 1931 Pamirs
Bryophila klapperichi (Boursin, 1960) Afghanistan
Bryophila miltophaea Hampson, 1908 western Turkestan
Bryophila ochrophaea Hampson, 1908 Kasmir
Bryophila idonea Christoph, 1893 Turkey, northern Iran
Bryophila puengeleri Draudt, 1931 China (Xinjiang)
Bryophila vilis Hampson, 1908 western Turkestan
Bryophila mongolica  Boursin, 1961) Mongolia (eastern Tannuola)
Bryophila kaszabi Pekarsky, Volynkin & Matov, 2014 western Mongolia
Subgenus Bryoleuca
Bryophila seladona Christoph, 1885 eastern Turkey, Armenia, Azerbaijan, Georgia, southern European Russia, Ukraine, North Macedonia, northern Greece, Bulgaria, Turkey
Bryophila raddei (Boursin, 1953) Transcaucasia, north-eastern Turkey, Armenia, north-western Iran
Bryophila malachitica Ronkay, Fibiger & Steiner, 2009 Caucasus
Bryophila vandalusiae Duponchel, 1842 south-western Europe, southern France, Corsica, Morocco, Libya, Egypt
Bryophila thinicola (Hreblay & Ronkay, 1998) Nepal
Bryophila ravuloides (Boursin, 1954) Kashmir
Bryophila rectilinea (Warren, 1909) Italy, south-eastern Europe, Asia Minor, Syria, Lebanon, Israel, Iraq
Bryophila amseli (Boursin, 1952) Israel
Bryophila microphysa (Boursin, 1952) Cyprus
Bryophila tephrocharis (Boursin, 1954) south-eastern Europe, Turkey, Iran, Lebanon, Israel, Jordan, Cyprus
Bryophila ravula (Hübner, [1813]) France, Switzerland, southern Germany, northern Africa, south-western Europe
Bryophila rueckbeili (Boursin, 1953) Turkestan
Bryophila ereptricula Treitschke, 1825 Europe
Bryophila galathea Millière, 1875 southern France
Bryophila amoenissima Turati, 1909 Italy
Bryophila petricolor Lederer, 1870 northern Greece, Transcaucasus, Armenia, northern Iran
Bryophila pittawayi (Wiltshire, 1986) Arabia
Bryophila harithya (Wiltshire, 1990)
Bryophila remanei (Heydemann & Schulte, 1963) Iraq
Bryophila labecula Lederer, 1855 Syria
Bryophila thamanaea Hampson, 1908 Iran
Bryophila raptricula (Denis & Schiffermüller, 1775) northern Africa, EU, Near East, Central Asia, Korea
Bryophila felina (Eversmann, 1852) Armenia, Turkestan
Bryophila pljushtchi (Pekarsky, 2015) Afghanistan
Bryophila volodia (An, Choi & Ronkay, 2013) Vietnam
Bryophila nahnybidai (Pekarsky, 2014)
Bryophila protracta Christoph, 1893 Turkey
Bryophila diehli (Boursin, 1960) Saudi Arabia
Bryophila omega (Gyulai & Ronkay, 2001) Qinghai
Bryophila zeta (Plante, 1989)
Bryophila orthogramma (Boursin, 1954) Turkestan, Ukraine, Moldova, Bulgaria, Serbia, Kosovo, south-eastern Siberia, Korea, Japan
Bryophila gea (Boursin, 1954) Algeria, Morocco, Spain
Bryophila hannemanni (Boursin, 1961) Margelan
Bryophila eucta Hampson, 1908 northern Iran, western Turkestan
Bryophila argentacea Bytinski-Salz & Brandt, 1937 Iran
Bryophila ovchi (Pekarsky, 2019) Tajikistan
Subgenus Moureia
Bryophila microglossa (Rambur, 1858) Algeria, Spain, Syria
Bryophila petrea Guenée, 1852 south-western Europe, southern France, Corsica, Greece, Kurdistan, Asia Minor, Syria, Jordan, Lebanon, Palestine, Iraq, Cyprus
Subgenus Bryophila
Bryophila domestica (Hufnagel, 1766) southern Europe, France, southern Sweden, Germany, Poland, Austria, Switzerland, Hungary, Romania, Bulgaria
Bryophila diachorisma (Boursin, 1960) Afghanistan
Bryophila gigantea (Boursin, 1960) Afghanistan
Bryophila orocharis Boursin, 1944 western Himalayas
Bryophila eberti (Boursin, 1961) Afghanistan
Bryophila albimixta Sugi, 1980 Korea, Japan
Bryophila granitalis (Butler, 1881) Korea, Japan
Bryophila herczigi (Hreblay & Ronkay, 2000) Taiwan
Bryophila barbaria (Schawerda, 1934) Morocco
Bryophila schwingenschussi (Boursin, 1954) Algeria
Bryophila blepharista (Boursin, 1954) Morocco
Bryophila aerumna Culot, 1912 Algeria
Bryophila duseutrei Oberthür, 1922 Morocco
Subgenus Hymenocryphia
Bryophila modesta Moore, 1881 Punjab
Bryophila pulverosa (Warren, 1909) Kashmir
Bryophila pelidna (Boursin, 1967) Afghanistan
Bryophila cyanea (Boursin, 1969) India (Unies)
Bryophila subcyanea (Hreblay & Ronkay, 1999) Nepal
Bryophila beigli (Hacker, 1990)
Bryophila canosparsa Draudt, 1950 Yunnan
Bryophila wiltshirei (Boursin, 1954) Kashmir
Bryophila strobinoi (Dujardin, 1972) Greece
Bryophila altivolans (Hacker, 1990)
Bryophila pulverulenta Boursin, 1944 western Himalayas
Bryophila kautti (Hacker, 1996)
Bryophila testouti Boursin, 1944 western Yunnan

References

Bryophilinae
Moth genera